Broken Arrow Public Schools (BAPS) is a public school district in Broken Arrow, Oklahoma. It was established in 1904. The district resides in an urban-suburban community with nearby agricultural areas and a growing business and industrial base. Serving more than 19,000 students, BAPS has four early childhood centers (Pre-K), 15 elementary schools (grades K-5), five middle schools (grades 6-8), one freshman academy (ninth grade), one high school (grades 10-12), one options academy (BA Academy, BA Virtual School and the now defunct Margaret Hudson Program).

Broken Arrow High School and the Freshman Academy are fully accredited by the state of Oklahoma and the North Central Association of Secondary Schools and Colleges.

History
In 2021 Broken Arrow schools began participating in Tulsa Community College's pilot program for early college, EDGE: Earn a Degree Graduate Early (formerly Early College High School).

High schools
Broken Arrow High School (Grades 10-12)
Broken Arrow Freshman Academy (Grade 9)
Broken Arrow Options Academy (BA Academy, BA Virtual School, & Margaret Hudson Program)

Middle schools
Ernest Childers Middle School
Centennial Middle School
Oliver Middle School
Oneta Ridge Middle School
Sequoyah Middle School

Elementary schools
Arrowhead Elementary
Aspen Creek Elementary
Country Lane Intermediate (Grades 3rd - 5th)
Country Lane Primary (Grades K - 2nd)
Creekwood Elementary
Highland Park Elementary
Leisure Park Elementary
Liberty Elementary
Lynn Wood Elementary
Oak Crest Elementary
Rhoades Elementary
Spring Creek Elementary
Timber Ridge Elementary
Vandever Elementary
Wolf Creek Elementary

Early Childhood Schools
Arrow Springs ECC
Aspen Creek ECC
Creekwood ECC
Park Lane ECC

References

External links

Broken Arrow Public Schools official website

Broken Arrow, Oklahoma
School districts in Oklahoma
Education in Tulsa County, Oklahoma
Education in Wagoner County, Oklahoma
1904 establishments in Oklahoma Territory